Mexico competed at the 2019 Parapan American Games held from August 23 to September 1, 2019 in Lima, Peru. In total athletes representing Mexico won 55 gold medals, 58 silver medals and 45 bronze medals and the country finished 3rd in the medal table.

Athletics 

Athletes representing Mexico won 16 gold medals, 16 silver medals and 18 bronze medals.

Boccia 

Eduardo Sanchez won the gold medal in the individual BC1 event and Eduardo Ventura won the bronze medal in that event.

Judo 

Eduardo Avila won the gold medal in the men's half-middleweight (81 kg) event.

Brayan Valencia won the gold medal in the men's middleweight (90 kg) event.

Lenia Ruvalcaba won the gold medal in the women's middleweight (70 kg) event.

Raul Oritz won a bronze medal in the men's lightweight (73 kg) event.

Table tennis 

Table tennis players representing Mexico won three gold medals and three silver medals.

Victor Reyes won the gold medal in the men's singles C2 event.

Miguel Vazquez won the silver medal in the men's singles C9 event.

Maria Sigala won the gold medal in the women's singles C2-3 event.

Martha Verdin won the silver medal in the women's singles C4 event.

Claudia Perez won the gold medal in the women's singles C7 event.

Mexican table tennis players also won the silver medal in the women's team C2-5 event.

Wheelchair basketball 

Mexico competed in both the men's tournament and the women's tournament.

References 

2019 in Mexican sports
Mexico at the Pan American Games
Nations at the 2019 Parapan American Games